Bădragii Noi is a village in Edineț District, Moldova.

References

Villages of Edineț District
Populated places on the Prut
Khotinsky Uyezd
Hotin County
Ținutul Suceava